Ravensbourne railway station is in the London Borough of Bromley in south London. The station adjoins Beckenham Place Park and serves the north edge of Beckenham and Shortlands.

It is in Travelcard Zone 4, and the station and all trains are operated by Thameslink.

Opened in 1892 by the London, Chatham and Dover Railway as part of their new Catford Loop line, the station retains its Victorian air of a quiet country station although its roadside booking office was rebuilt after a fire in 1988.

Services 
All services at Ravensbourne are operated by Thameslink using Class 700 EMUs.

The typical off-peak service in trains per hour is:

 2 tph to London Blackfriars
 2 tph to  via 

In addition, the service to London Blackfriars is extended to and from  via .

References

External links 

Railway stations in the London Borough of Bromley
Former London, Chatham and Dover Railway stations
Railway stations in Great Britain opened in 1892
Railway stations served by Govia Thameslink Railway